Peter Joseph Aghoghovbia (15 April 1941 – 19 July 2010) was a Nigerian international footballer. He played as a centre forward.

Career
Aghoghovbia earned two caps for Nigeria in December 1968, having previously participated at the 1968 Summer Olympics.

References

1941 births
2010 deaths
Footballers at the 1968 Summer Olympics
Nigerian footballers
Nigeria international footballers
Olympic footballers of Nigeria
Association football forwards